Aware is the eighth album released by Salvador. It was released on April 29, 2008 through Word.

Critical reception
The album has received positive reviews. Lizza Connor Bowen of New Release Today stated that "...The smart lyrics mix keen observation and genuine, vertical praise. On Aware, Salvador continues to answer the aforementioned question with one consistent answer: Jesus." Jesus Freak Hideout stated "Salvador doesn't exactly try anything new on Aware, but the guys do continue to perfect what they know all too well and that's making music that pleases..."

Track listing

Personnel 
Salvador
 Nic Gonzales – lead vocals, acoustic guitars, electric guitars
 Chris Bevins – keyboards, programming, backing vocals, horn arrangements
 Josh Gonzales – bass, backing vocals
 Ben Cordonero – drums
 Alejandro Santoyo – percussion
 Craig Swift – flute, alto saxophone, tenor saxophone
 Leif Shires – trumpet, flugelhorn

Additional musicians
 Otto Price – keyboards, synthesizers, programming, guitars, bass, backing vocals 
 Chris Carmichael – strings, string arrangements 
 Jaci Velasquez – lead and backing vocals (4)

Production 
 Otto Price – A&R direction, executive producer, producer
 Nic Gonzales – producer 
 Chris Bevins – co-producer, engineer 
 Jerry Guidroz – assistant engineer
 Bryan Lenox – mixing
 Richard Dodd – mastering 
 Katherine Petillo – creative director
 Ray Roper – design
 Allan Clarke – photography
 Samantha Roe – hair stylist, make-up, wardrobe stylist

Chart performance

References

2008 albums
Salvador (band) albums